Alessandro Martinelli (born 30 May 1993) is a Swiss professional footballer, currently playing as midfielder for FC Mendrisio in Seconda Lega, the sixth tier of Swiss football league system.

Club career

Sampdoria
Born in Mendrisio, Ticino, an Italian-speaking canton, Switzerland, Martinelli moved south to Italy to start his professional career. He left the reserve team of U.C. Sampdoria in 2012 for Calcio Portogruaro Summaga.

Martinelli returned to Sampdoria in June 2013; he signed a new 5-year contract with the Genoese club.

On 2 September 2013, he was signed by Venezia. On 7 July 2014, he was signed by Modena in a temporary deal, with an option to purchase.

Brescia
He left for Brescia in the same formula on 9 July 2015.

On 25 July 2016, the loan was renewed, and in August 2017 Martinelli signed for Brescia on a permanent basis.

Palermo
In August 2019 he was signed by Serie D club Palermo. As a regular, and also captaining the team in Mario Santana's absence, he won promotion to Serie C on his debut season with the Rosanero.

On 7 September 2020, Palermo announced Martinelli was forced to retire from active football due to cardiac issues.

International career
Martinelli played every game in 2010 UEFA European Under-17 Championship. He also played for Swiss U18 team against Belgium and against Spain. He also received call-up against Austria and France but did not play. He only played once for Swiss U19 team in competitive match in 2012 UEFA European Under-19 Football Championship elite qualification. He received call-up against Northern Ireland (he played once), Finland, (he played twice) Netherlands (once) and Estonia (once) in friendlies. In October 2013 he received his first U21 call-up. He made his debut as one of the starting XI.

Career statistics

Club

References

External links

 AIC profile (data by football.it) 
 Lega Serie B profile 

1993 births
Living people
People from Mendrisio
Association football midfielders
Swiss men's footballers
Grasshopper Club Zürich players
U.C. Sampdoria players
A.S.D. Portogruaro players
Venezia F.C. players
Modena F.C. players
Brescia Calcio players
Palermo F.C. players
FC Mendrisio players
Serie B players
Serie C players
Switzerland under-21 international footballers
Switzerland youth international footballers
Swiss expatriate footballers
Expatriate footballers in Italy
Swiss people of Italian descent
Sportspeople from Ticino